Columbus is a village in Adams County, Illinois, United States. The population was 114 at the 2020 census. It is part of the Quincy, IL–MO Micropolitan Statistical Area.

History
Columbus was platted in 1835. A post office called Columbus was established in 1837, and remained in operation until 1963.

Geography
Columbus is located at  (39.988141, -91.147503).

Demographics

As of the 2020 census there were 114 people, 32 households, and 21 families residing in the village. The racial makeup of the village was 92.11% White, 1.75% African American, and 6.14% from two or more races. Hispanic or Latino of any race were 5.26% of the population.

There were 32 households, out of which 65.63% had children under the age of 18 living with them, 56.25% were married couples living together, 9.38% had a female householder with no husband present, and 34.38% were non-families. 34.38% of all households were made up of individuals, and 15.63% had someone living alone who was 65 years of age or older. The average household size was 3.24 and the average family size was 2.50.

The village's age distribution consisted of 26.3% under the age of 18, 15.0% from 18 to 24, 32.6% from 25 to 44, 15.1% from 45 to 64, and 11.3% who were 65 years of age or older. The median age was 36.3 years. For every 100 females, there were 86.0 males. For every 100 females age 18 and over, there were 59.5 males.

The median income for a household in the village was $63,750, and the median income for a family was $90,417. Males had a median income of $57,083 versus $15,000 for females. The per capita income for the village was $23,494. About 4.8% of families and 6.3% of the population were below the poverty line, including none of those under age 18 or those age 65 or over.

References

Villages in Adams County, Illinois
Quincy, Illinois micropolitan area
Villages in Illinois